This is a list of Turkish football transfers in the summer transfer window 2015 by club. Only transfers of the Süper Lig is included.

Süper Lig

Galatasaray

In:

Out:

Fenerbahçe

In:

Out:

Beşiktaş

In:

Out:

İstanbul Başakşehir

In:

Out:

Trabzonspor

In:

Out:

Bursaspor

In:

Out:

Torku Konyaspor

 
In:

Out:

Gençlerbirliği

In:

Out:

Gaziantepspor

In:

Out:

Eskişehirspor

In:

Out:

Akhisar Belediyespor

In:

Out:

Kasımpaşa

In:

Out:

Çaykur Rizespor

In:

Out:

Sivasspor

In:

Out:

Kayserispor

In:

Out:

Osmanlıspor

In:

Out:

Antalyaspor

In:

Out:

References

Transfers
Turkey
2015